The Calamba City Council is Calamba's Sangguniang Panlungsod or legislative body. The council has 15 members which is composed of 12 councilors, one ex officio member elected from the ranks of barangay (village) chairmen, one ex officio member elected from the ranks of Sangguniang Kabataan (youth council) chairmen and one presiding officer. The Vice-mayor of the city is the presiding officer of the council, who is elected citywide.

The council is responsible for creating laws and ordinances under the city's jurisdiction. The mayor can veto proposed bills, but the council can override it with a two-thirds supermajority.

Powers, duties and functions
The Local Government Code of 1991 (Republic Act No. 7160), which establishes the Sangguniang Panlungsod as the city's legislative body, contains the following requirements:

Pass legislation;
Consent to resolutions;
Adequate funding for the city's and its residents' general wellbeing; and
Make sure the city is exercising its corporate rights in accordance with Section 22 of the Local Government Code.

Additionally, the Sangguniang Panlungsod is given responsibility for the following tasks and activities:

approve the resolutions and ordinances required for an effective and efficient city government;
Generate and maximize the utilization of funds and resources for the city's development plans, program goals, and top priorities as specified in Section 18 of the Local Government Code of 1991, paying special attention to expansion and improvement in the entire metropolis and agro-industrial development;
Pass laws awarding franchises and permitting the issuance of permits or licenses, subject to the guidelines in Book II of the Local Government Code of 1991, but with conditions and goals intended to advance the welfare of the city's residents;
Control activities pertaining to the use of land, buildings, and structures inside the city to advance the welfare of its populace as a whole;
Approve ordinances that would guarantee the effective and efficient provision of the fundamental facilities and services as specified in Section 17 of the Local Government Code; and
Use any additional powers and carry out any additional tasks or obligations outlined in a law or ordinance.

Membership
The city elects twelve members of the council at-large. In plurality-at-large voting, a voter may vote for up to ten candidates and the candidates with the ten highest numbers of votes are elected. Barangay and SK chairs throughout the city each elect a representative to the council, for a total of 14 councilors. City-council elections are synchronized with other elections in the country, which have been held on the second Monday of May every third year since 1992.

2022 - 2025 Membership

Past members

2019 - 2022 Membership

2016 - 2019 Membership

2013 - 2016 Membership

2010 - 2013 Membership

2007 - 2010 Membership

2004 - 2007 Membership

2001 - 2004 Membership

Prominent members
Ramil Hernandez - Governor of Laguna
Charisse Anne Hernandez - House of Representatives member for Lone District of Calamba
Ruth Mariano-Hernandez - House of Representatives member for 2nd District of Laguna

See also
Calamba

References

Calamba, Laguna
City councils in the Philippines